"Untouchable" is the third single by Australian recording artist Johnny Ruffo. It was written by Ruffo, Michael Tan, Cliff Raux, and Gary Pinto, and produced by Michael Tan and Louis Schoorl. It was released on 12 July 2013

Background
While talking about the track, Ruffo said "If you listen to the artists that influenced me – Justin Timberlake, Michael Jackson, Stevie Wonder and Queen – and you listen to their vocal production, it's really intricate. We really tried to emulate the sound of a Quincy Jones-type production on this song. The idea was trying to bring some of the old skool vibe back, and I think that's sort of making a return with artists like Bruno Mars, Daft Punk/Pharrell and Robin Thicke anyway. In that sense it's actually the perfect time to release a song like this."

Promotion
Ruffo did a number of in-store performances in Westfield throughout July in Victoria, New South Wales, Queensland & Western Australia as well as a performance on Sunrise on July 25, 2013.

Charts

Release history

References

2013 songs
2013 singles
Johnny Ruffo songs
Sony Music Australia singles
Songs written by Gary Pinto